Pikalov (Russian: Пикалов) is a Russian masculine surname, its feminine counterpart is Pikalova. The surname may refer to the following notable people:
Daria Pikalova (born 1994), Russian Paralympic swimmer
Marina Pikalova (born 1985) is a Kazakhstani handball player
Vladimir Pikalov (1924–2003), Soviet general

Russian-language surnames